The South African Railways Class 8A 4-8-0 of 1902 was a steam locomotive from the pre-Union era in Transvaal.

In 1902, the Imperial Military Railways placed forty Cape 8th Class  Mastodon type steam locomotives in service. When the Central South African Railways was established later that same year, they were designated Class 8-L1. In 1912, when they were assimilated into the South African Railways, they were renumbered and designated Class 8A.

Manufacturers
Due to the shortage of locomotives brought about by wartime conditions during the Second Boer War, the Imperial Military Railways (IMR) placed orders for forty Cape 8th Class locomotives with two Scottish locomotive manufacturers in 1901. They were built to the specifications of the 8th Class  Mastodon type which had been designed by H.M. Beatty, the chief locomotive superintendent of the Cape Government Railways (CGR) from 1896 to 1910, and were the last locomotives to be ordered under the military administration of the railways in the Transvaal and Orange Free State.

Upon the cessation of hostilities in June 1902, the working of all railways was handed over to civil control. On 1 July 1902, the IMR became the Central South African Railways (CSAR).

These forty 8th Class locomotives therefore came onto the CSAR roster, where they were designated Class 8-L1. The twenty engines which had been built by Neilson, Reid and Company were numbered in the range from 401 to 420, and the twenty built by Sharp, Stewart and Company in the range from 421 to 440.

At least one of the engines was named. No. 428 bore the name of Secretary of State for the Colonies Joseph Chamberlain, with the name inscribed on the tender sides rather than on the engine itself.

Characteristics
The cylinders were arranged outside the bar frame, with balanced slide valves above, actuated by Stephenson valve gear through rocker shafts. The locomotives were delivered with type XF tenders, which rode on 2-axle bogies and had a capacity of  coal and  water.

South African Railways
When the Union of South Africa was established on 31 May 1910, the three Colonial government railways (CGR, Natal Government Railways and CSAR) were united under a single administration to control and administer the railways, ports and harbours of the Union. Although the South African Railways and Harbours came into existence in 1910, the actual classification and renumbering of all the rolling stock of the three constituent railways were only implemented with effect from 1 January 1912.

When these forty locomotives were assimilated into the South African Railways (SAR) in 1912, they were renumbered in the range from 1092 to 1131 and designated .

In 1912, all the CGR's 8th Class 2-8-0 Consolidation types and 8th Class  Mastodon types, together with the CSAR's Class 8-L2 and 8-L3  Mastodon type locomotives, were grouped into ten different sub-classes by the SAR. The  locomotives became SAR Classes 8 and 8A to 8F and the  locomotives became Classes 8X to 8Z.

Modification
During A.G. Watson's term as Chief Mechanical Engineer (CME) of the SAR from 1929 to 1936, many of the Class 8 to Class 8F locomotives were equipped with superheated boilers, larger bore cylinders and either inside or outside admission piston valves.

Of the Class 8A locomotives, fourteen were equipped with superheated boilers,  bore cylinders and outside admission piston valves, while retaining their Class 8A classification.

Service

Government railways
In SAR service, the  Class 8 family of locomotives served on every system in the country and, in the 1920s, became the mainstay of motive power on many branch lines. Their final days were spent in shunting service. They were all withdrawn from service by 1972.

Industrial
In November 1971, one Class 8A locomotive, no. 1126, was sold to the Zambesi Saw Mills (ZSM) in Zambia. This was the last locomotive to be purchased by this logging company, which worked the teak forests which stretched  to the north-west of Livingstone in Zambia. It had built one of the longest logging railways in the world to serve its sawmill at Mulobezi.
 
Railway operations ceased at Mulobezi around 1972, whilst operation of the line to Livingstone was taken over by the Zambia Railways (ZR) in 1973. After logging operations had ceased and the ZR had taken over the mainline, engine no. 1126 was employed as a shunting locomotive at Mulobezi. It was returned to Livingstone in December 1975 and eventually, in June 1983, it went to the Railway Museum at Livingstone.

Preservation

Works numbers
The Classes 8A and 8AW builders, works numbers, renumbering and superheating modifications are listed in the table.

Illustration
The main picture shows SAR Class 8A no. 1106 at Breyten, Transvaal, on 4 April 1981, before it was plinthed at Ermelo. The original appearance of the locomotive with slide valves and its appearance after modification with outside admission piston valves are illustrated by the pictures below.

References

1530
1530
4-8-0 locomotives
2D locomotives
Neilson Reid locomotives
Sharp Stewart locomotives
Cape gauge railway locomotives
Railway locomotives introduced in 1902
1902 in South Africa